"Byle jak" (English: "Anyhow") is a song by Polish singer Margaret. It was included on the deluxe edition of her third studio album, Monkey Business (2017). The song was written by Emil Gullhamn, Sebastian Hallifax, Dimitri Stassos, and Margaret, and produced by Stassos. It was released to contemporary hit radio in Poland on 21 December 2017 as the second single from Monkey Business, premiering on Radio ZET.

Margaret added "Byle jak" to her concert set list in June 2016, a year before its official studio version was released on Monkey Business. She revealed in 2018 that she wrote the song for another Polish artist three years prior, but after they did not record it, she decided to include it on her album. Margaret performed "Byle jak" for the first time on television in September 2017 at the National Festival of Polish Song broadcast by TVP1. The single reached number six on the Polish Airplay Chart, and earned Margaret her first Fryderyk nomination. Its music video was the 10th most watched Polish music video on YouTube in 2018.

Music video
A music video for "Byle jak" was released as a short film titled "Nie chce / Byle jak", which also served as a music video for another song from Monkey Business, "Nie chce" ("I Don't Want To"). The film was directed by Konrad Aksinowicz, who also co-wrote its screenplay with Margaret. It premiered exclusively in Multikino theater in Złote Tarasy, Warsaw, Poland on 22 November 2017, few days before being officially released on YouTube.

Its shortened version which only included the "Byle jak" section of the video was the 10th most watched Polish music video on YouTube in 2018 with 39.3 million views as of 6 December 2018 when the list was published.

Accolades

Charts

Weekly charts

Year-end charts

Release history

References

2017 singles
2017 songs
Magic Records singles
Margaret (singer) songs
Songs written by Dimitri Stassos
Songs written by Margaret (singer)